Goodmark Foods, Inc. is an American food manufacturing company, based in Raleigh, North Carolina. It produces "meat snacks, packaged meats, and extruded grain snacks," especially Slim Jim jerky meat snacks. It is owned by ConAgra.

Company history
Slim Jim snacks originated in Philadelphia. Its manufacturer Cherry-Levis Food Company was sold to General Mills in 1967 for about $20 million and renamed Slim Jim, Inc. In 1970, General Mills purchased Jesse Jones Sausage Co. in Garner, North Carolina, and formed GoodMark Foods, Inc. to make Slim Jims there. Ron Doggett, a General Mills finance executive involved in the purchase of Cherry-Levis, had moved to North Carolina to participate in managing the operations. "In June 1982, he directed a unique leveraged buyout with three other executives of GoodMark from General Mills, who had put the subsidiary up for sale." They took the company public in 1985. The company's stock was traded on NASDAQ as GDMK.

It was acquired by ConAgra, Inc. in 1998 for $225 million. GoodMark's annual sales were about $170 million at that time. Doggett retired as chairman, president and CEO in 1999, a year later.

Products and brands
Slim Jim meat snacks
Penrose sausages
Pemmican meat snacks 
Andy Capp's grain snacks
Jesse Jones sausages
Bugles

Notes

External links
ConAgra

Conagra Brands
Companies based in Raleigh, North Carolina
1998 mergers and acquisitions